SUFC can refer to one of the following:


Australia
 Sydney University Fencing Club, part of the University of Sydney's sporting body
 Sydney University Football Club

England
 Saltdean United F.C.
 Sandbach United F.C.
 Scunthorpe United F.C.
 Sheffield United F.C.
 Skelmersdale United F.C.
 Southend United F.C.
 Spalding United F.C.
 Stambridge United F.C.
 Sutton United F.C.

Northern Ireland
 Saintfield United F.C.
 Shankill United F.C.

Other places
 Saltash United F.C., Cornwall
 Seoul United FC, Korea
 Supersport United F.C., South Africa